Nameh Beyt Hardan (also Romanized as Na‘meh Beyt Ḩardān; also known as Na‘meh) is a village in Howmeh-ye Sharqi Rural District, in the Central District of Dasht-e Azadegan County, Khuzestan Province, Iran. At the 2006 census, its population was 174, in 24 families.

References 

Populated places in Dasht-e Azadegan County